Mongoliin Temuulel FC is a Mongolian sports club that fields male and female sides in association football and futsal.

History
Mongoliin Temuulel won the national youth football championship in 2016, defeating SP Falcons to win the title. The club won the Mongolian Football Federation's state futsal championship in 2017. They beat Bayangol FC 5–1 in the final to win the title. Also in 2017, the football club won the Mandalgovi Open Cup hosted in Mandalgovi. The club beat out eleven other teams, including Soyombiin Baarsuud FC, Darkhan City FC, and FC Sumida, en route to the championship.

In 2019 the senior male football team competed in the inaugural season of the Mongolia Second League. They finished in third place in what was to be their only season in the league.

Domestic history
Key

References

External links
MFF profile
Eleven Sports channel

Football clubs in Mongolia